The following are the national records in athletics in Togo maintained by Togo's national athletics federation: Fédération Togolaise d'Athlétisme (FTA).

Outdoor

Key to tables:
  

h = hand timing

A = affected by altitude

# = not recognised by IAAF

Men

Women

Indoor

Men

Women

Notes

References

External links

Togo
Records
Athletics